The 2008 congressional elections in Colorado were held on November 4, 2008 to determine who will represent the state of Colorado in the United States House of Representatives, coinciding with the presidential and senatorial elections. Representatives are elected for two-year terms; those elected served in the 111th Congress from January 3, 2009 until January 3, 2011.

Colorado had seven seats in the House, apportioned according to the 2000 United States Census. Its 2007-2008 congressional delegation consisted of four Democrats and three Republicans. After the elections, it consisted of five Democrats and two Republicans. District 4 changed party (from Republican to Democratic), which was the only district CQ Politics had forecasted to be at some risk for the incumbent party.

The Primary election was held August 12, 2008.

Overview

Match-up summary

District breakdown

District 1

 
Democratic incumbent Diana DeGette won against Republican nominee George Lilly. DeGette was unopposed in her primary, and Lilly won against Charles Crain in his primary. CQ Politics forecasted the race as 'Safe Democrat'.

District 2

 
Democratic nominee Jared Polis, a businessman, won against Republican nominee Scott Starin, an aerospace engineer. CQ Politics forecasted the race as 'Safe Democrat'.

This district had been represented by Democrat Mark Udall since 1999. With the retirement of Senator Wayne Allard, Udall ran for the Senate, leaving this an open seat. Polis won the Democratic primary against Senate President Joan Fitz-Gerald and Colorado Conservation Trust Director Will Shafroth. Starin was unopposed in the Republican primary. Former Eagle County Commissioner Tom Stone was earlier considered a possible Republican candidate, as was Boulder Mayor Mark Ruzzin for the Green Party. Democrats held a strong edge in this district, with the most recent Democratic presidential candidate, John Kerry, having won 59% in 2004, as it was centered around heavily Democratic Boulder.

District 3

 
Democratic incumbent John Salazar won against Republican nominee Wayne Wolf. CQ Politics forecasted the race as 'Safe Democrat'.

District 4

 
Democratic nominee Betsy Markey, businesswoman and regional director for Senator Ken Salazar won against Republican incumbent Marilyn Musgrave), who had represented this district since 2003. Both ran unopposed in the party primary elections. CQ Politics forecasted the race as 'Leans Democratic'. The Rothenberg Political Report rated it 'Toss-Up/Tilt Democratic'. The Cook Political Report ranked it 'Republican Toss Up'.

Musgrave, a conservative known for her staunch opposition to gay marriage, won in 2006 by winning a plurality (46%) of the vote against Angie Paccione (D) and a strong Reform Party challenge from Eric Eidsness, who managed to garner 11% of the vote. That, along with her 51% showing in 2004 despite George W. Bush winning 58% of the vote in this eastern Colorado district that includes the Fort Collins area, made her vulnerable in 2008.

Democrats suffered a setback earlier when State Senator Brandon Schaffer suddenly dropped out, citing his party's failure to clear the field. Eidsness switched parties again, having switched from Republican to Reform Party the year prior, and became a Democrat, which could have fueled a potential rematch with Musgrave in 2008. 2006 nominee Angie Paccione briefly launched a campaign as well, but left the race in September 2007. On October 24, 2008, the National Republican Congressional Committee abandoned Marilyn Musgrave's 2008 reelection campaign, believing the race was lost. This decision was based solely on Musgrave's poor poll numbers.

Musgrave launched a negative advertisement, attacking Markey over the business of Syscom Systems, the data-processing equipment company run by Markey and her husband.  The Musgrave ad was called "highly misleading" by a Denver television station that investigated the facts. After her defeat, Musgrave would not comment on the election results with the media, nor would she concede the race or contact Markey to congratulate her. She also did not thank her campaign staff for their efforts. She later recorded a robocall for Republican Georgia senator Saxby Chambliss, saying that she was defeated by "leftist special interests" who "suppressed the truth with vicious attacks and lies."

District 5

 
Freshman Republican incumbent Doug Lamborn won against Democratic nominee Hal Bidlack, a Clinton administration National Security Council official, and Independent Rich Hand campaign website, running as a write-in candidate. The district is based in heavily Republican Colorado Springs. CQ Politics forecasted the race as 'Safe Republican'.

Lamborn got bad press when two constituents accused him of making a threatening phone call in response to a critical letter they wrote. He won against Jeff Crank and Bentley Rayburn, more moderate Republicans who had also run in 2006, in the Republican primary. In 2006, Lamborn had narrowly won a nasty multi-candidate primary with 27% of the vote, despite previous representative Joel Hefley's endorsement of Crank, citing Lamborn's "sleazy" campaign. Crank and Rayburn thus came to a gentleman's agreement - they would jointly conduct a poll of the primary, and whoever of the two of them was in third place would drop out and endorse the other, so as to have a better chance of defeating Lamborn. Rayburn came third in the poll, but he refused to drop out and Lamborn won the primary with 44% of the vote.

Amid worries of vulnerability, Lamborn then won the general election by a 59%-41% margin, becoming the highest vote getter for a GOP Congressional candidate in the state in the 2006 cycle.

District 6

 
Republican nominee Mike Coffman won against Democratic nominee Hank Eng. CQ Politics, The Cook Political Report and The Rothenberg Political Report all forecasted the race as 'Safe Republican', despite some minor controversies surrounding Mike Coffman and Colorado Ethics Watch.

Eng ran unopposed in the Democratic Primary. Coffman defeated a crowded field of candidates including Ted Harvey, Steve Ward, and Will Armstrong (who was endorsed by the State GOP). Republican incumbent Tom Tancredo, who held the seat since 1999, decided to retire leaving it an open seat. His seat was considered to be the most Republican-dominated district of the Denver-area seats and was also one of the wealthiest in the nation. Tancredo was the second highest vote getter for a Republican congressional candidate statewide (59%-40%) in 2006, just behind Doug Lamborn in the 5th district. The district includes Columbine High School, which was devastated in a tragic 1999 school massacre.

District 7

 
Democratic incumbent Ed Perlmutter, who had represented this district since 2007, won against Republican nominee John W. Lerew. CQ Politics forecasted the race as 'Safe Democrat'.

In 2006, Perlmutter won 55% of the vote in this suburban Denver district that narrowly went to John Kerry with 52% in 2004. The district's voter registration was split, with independents constituting a slim plurality of 35% compared to Democrats (34%) and Republicans (31%).

References
Specific

General
 2008 Competitive House Race Chart The Cook Political Report, October 28, 2008
 2008 House Ratings The Rothenberg Political Report, October 22, 2008

External links
Elections Center from the Colorado Secretary of State
U.S. Congress candidates for Colorado at Project Vote Smart
Colorado U.S. House Races from 2008 Race Tracker
Campaign contributions for Colorado congressional races from OpenSecrets
District 1 race ranking and details from CQ Politics
District 1 campaign contributions from OpenSecrets
District 2 race ranking and details from CQ Politics
District 2 campaign contributions from OpenSecrets
District 3 race ranking and details from CQ Politics
District 3 campaign contributions from OpenSecrets
District 4 race ranking and details from CQ Politics
District 4 campaign contributions from OpenSecrets
Musgrave (R-i) vs Markey (D) graph of collected poll results from Pollster.com
District 5 race ranking and details from CQ Politics
District 5 campaign contributions from OpenSecrets
Cherry Creek News: Where's Hank from Cherry Creek News
District 6 race ranking and details from CQ Politics
District 6 campaign contributions from OpenSecrets
District 7 race ranking and details from CQ Politics
District 7 campaign contributions from OpenSecrets

2008
Colorado
United States House of Representatives